Tân Trạch may refer to several places in Vietnam:

 , a rural commune of Cần Đước District
 Tân Trạch, Quảng Bình, a rural commune of Bố Trạch District